Malasanga or Pano is an Austronesian language spoken by about 900 individuals in two villages on the north coast of Morobe Province, Papua New Guinea.

References

Languages of Morobe Province
Korap languages